Events from the year 1635 in Ireland.

Incumbent
Monarch: Charles I

Events
January 28–February 28 – a Star Chamber trial finds the City of London and Irish Society guilty of mismanagement of the plantation of Londonderry: it is fined £70,000 and obliged to surrender the Londonderry charter.
March 25 – Hailstones four inches (10 cm) in diameter fall at Castletown, south of Ballycumber.
April 14 – English adventurer John Clavell, practising as a doctor in Ireland at this time, marries a young Dublin heiress.
April 18 – the Parliament of Ireland passes an act requiring ale sellers to be licensed by magistrates; "An Act against Plowing by the Tayle, and pulling the Wooll off living Sheep"; and an act providing for the erection of houses of correction.
August 16 – a Galway jury refuses to find the king's title to land, juries in Roscommon, Sligo and Mayo having found for the king during the previous month.

Births

Deaths
November 8 – Aodh Buidhe Mac an Bhaird, writer, historian and hagiographer (b. c. 1593)

References

 
1630s in Ireland
Ireland
Years of the 17th century in Ireland